Ibn al-Ajdābī (Abū Ishāq Ibrāhīm ibn Ismā'īl ibn Ahmad ibn Abdallāh al-Lawātī al-Ajdābī al-Tarāblisī) died after c. 1077 AD (456 AH) was a prominent Libyan scholar and linguist. His fields of expertise covered Islamic jurisprudence, kalam, Arabic language and astronomy. He lived all his life in Tripoli and died and was buried there. He studied under Libyan scholars of his time and was famous for being interested in meeting those who traveled through Tripoli from the Mashriq and the Maghrib and acquiring wider knowledge from them. It is said that when he was asked about how he acquired all this knowledge, he replied, "I acquired it from the Huwwāra and Znāta gates," which refers to the names of two main gates to Tripoli, named after two Berber tribes.

Bibliography

 كفاية المتحفظ وغاية المتلفظ (The Learner's Adequacy and the Speaker's Aspiration)
 العروض الكبير (The Greater Prosody)
 العروض الصغير (The Lesser Prosody)
 شرح ما آخره ياء مشددة من الأسماء (Explanation of That Which Ends With Geminated Ya')
 مختصر في علم الأنساب (A Summary of the Science of Genealogy)
 مختصر نسب قريش (A Brief Genealogy of Quraish)
 الأزمنة والأنواء (Times and the Climate)
 الرد على أبي حفص بن مكي في تثقيف اللسان (Reply to Abu Hafs Ibn Makki on Training of the Tongue)

References

Libyan scholars
People from Tripoli, Libya
11th-century Libyan people
Jurisprudence academics
11th-century Berber people
Berber scholars